Pîrlița is a village in Fălești District, Moldova.

Notable people
 Ignație Budișteanu

References

Villages of Fălești District